Mephisto (born December 10, 1968) is the ring name of a Mexican luchador enmascarado, or masked professional wrestler and currently works for Consejo Mundial de Lucha Libre (CMLL). His real name is not a matter of official record as he is an enmascarado, which by lucha libre traditions means that his personal life is kept secret from the general public.

Mephisto is the son of Luchador Astro Rey/Kahoz and has previously worked both as Astro Rey Jr. and Kahoz Jr. but has been most successful as Mephisto. Since adopting the Mephisto gimmick he has been associated with the group Los Infernales ("The Infernal Ones") and later on Los Hijos del Averno ("The Sons of Hell"), especially working closely with Averno as his regular tag team partner for years. Mephisto and Averno are considered one of the top teams in Mexico between 2000 and 2010.

He is currently the leader of Los Hijos del Infierno ("The Sons of the Inferno") that also includes Ephesto and Luciferno. While working as Mephisto he has won multiple individual CMLL championships and held the Mexican National Trios Championship with the other Hijos del Infierno. Previous he has held the CMLL World Tag Team Championship (3 times), CMLL World Trios Championship, CMLL World Welterweight Championship, Mexican National Light Heavyweight Championship, Mexican National Welterweight Championship , NWA World Welterweight Championship and was the first ever holder of the NWA World Historic Welterweight Championship

Personal life
The man who would grow up to wrestle as Mephisto was born on December 12, 1968, in Mexico City, son of Alberto Leonel Hernández López, better known as the Luchador (professional wrestler) "Astro Rey" (Spanish for "Astro King") and later on as "Kahoz". By 1971 his father had started wrestling which meant that the future Mephisto grew up around wrestlers, wanting to become one himself from a very early age.

Professional wrestling career
After training under his father, and his uncle the luchador known as "El Gallo Giro", he made his debut as "Kahoz Jr.", as a tribute to his father's final wrestling character. From 1988 until 1993 he wrestled as Kahoz Jr. for various promotions in Mexico. His father, however, urged him to change gimmicks to the one that got his father the most fame "Astro Rey Jr.". As Astro Rey Jr. or simply "Astro Jr." he travelled the world and wrestled extensively in Mexico and Japan. On March 22, 1999, Astro Rey Jr. won the Mexican National Welterweight Championship from Arkangel de la Muerte and defended it several times during his 19-month reign. Astro Rey Jr. finally lost the title to Karloff Lagarde Jr. on October 23, 2000.

Los Infernales (2001-2009)

Over the summer of 2001 El Satánico, the leader of a team known as Los Infernales ("The Infernal ones") was involved in a storyline with former Infernales team members Último Guerrero, Rey Bucanero, Tarzan Boy who had turned on him. CMLL decided to expand the storyline, teaming El Satánico up with two other wrestlers, both of whom were repackaged to fit with the "infernal" theme of El Satánico. The storyline was that El Satánico used his supposed "satanic powers" to turn the tecnico (face) Rencor Latino into one of his "minions", the rudo (heel) known as "Averno" ("Hell") in a televised segment. After this turn was completed they were joined by Mephisto, formerly Kahoz Jr. and Astro Rey Jr., but unlike Averno, no references to his previous identities were made at the time. Together the three became the new version of Los Infernales and feuded with the splinter group of Infernales consisting of  Guerrero, Bucanero, Tarzan Boy and Máscara Mágica over the following year. A year later, September 2002 at the CMLL 68th Anniversary Show, the two groups faced off in a steel cage match to determine who had the rights to the "Los Infernales" name. In the end Satánico made Máscara Mágica submit gaining the rights for his own group as well as taking the mask of Máscara Mágica. After the steel cage match the feud between the two groups more or less ending, the splinter faction changed their name to Los Guerreros del Infierno ("The Warriors of the Inferno").

On June 23, 2002, Los Infernales won the Mexican National Trios Championship from Olímpico, Mr. Niebla and Safari. After they won the championship they began feuding with La Familia de Tijuana (Nicho el Millonario, Halloween and Damián 666). The trio lost the title to La Familia on September 27, 2002, but continued feuding into 2003. When Nicho stopped appearing for CMLL the trios championship was vacated but Los Infernales refused to take them without a match. This storyline led to an eight-team trios title tournament whichLos Infernales did not win. Instead Los Infernales did win a tournament to become the number one contenders for the CMLL World Trios Championship but lost to champions Black Tiger III, Dr. Wagner Jr. and Universo 2000 on August 1, 2003. At the end of the year, Averno and Mephisto turned on Satánico but there was little to feuding afterwards they split from the group and ventured out on their own. On February 4, 2004, Mephisto defeated El Satánico to win the CMLL World Welterweight Championship at CMLL's home at Arena México.

Triada del Terror / Perros del Mal (2006-2008)

Mephisto and Averno defeated Atlantis and Blue Panther for the CMLL World Tag Team Championship in a heated match on April 2, 2005. The team would defend the tag team titles several times over the next year in some very well-received matches that led to several reporters labeling them as one of the best Mexican tag teams in the 21st century. Their most prominent defense was on the last Arena México show of 2005 when they defeated El Hijo del Santo and Negro Casas in the main event. In early 2006, they defended their titles against Místico and Black Warrior twice. In the first match, they won by disqualification when Black Warrior interfered in the match after being pinned. In the second match two weeks later, Black Warrior turned on Místico, starting a long-running storyline between the two. On April 14, 2006, they lost the tag team championship to the team of Místico and Negro Casas, ending their year-long reign.

In late-2006/early-2007 Mephisto and Averno began teaming regularly with Ephesto (named after the Greek god Hephaestus), who was formerly known as Safari before. He was given an "underworld" character by CMLL and teamed up with Averno and Mephisto to create a regular trio team. The three came to the ring wearing black, hooded robes and were briefly introduced as Los Ku Klux Klan, but soon after dropped the controversial name to become known as La Triada del Terror ("The Terror Trio"). While the team of Mephisto and Averno had been busy defending the CMLL Tag Team titles Mephisto also found time to defend the CMLL World Welterweight title he had worn for over three years, until he was finally defeated by CMLL's rising star Místico on April 10, 2007, ending his title reign after days 1,141 days. In 2008 Mephisto and Averno were invited to join Perro Aguayo Jr.'s Perros del Mal ("The Bad Dogs") faction, while Ephesto was not asked to join them. The duo had only been a part of Los Perros del Mal for a short while before Aguayo Jr. and a number of other Perros members decided to leave CMLL. Mephisto and Averno remained with CMLL and teamed up with Ephesto once more as well as El Texano Jr. and El Terrible to form a group called La Jauria del Terror ("the Hounds of Terror", playing off the "Perros" name)

Los Hijos del Averno (2009-2014)

Not long after the group changed their name to Los Hijos del Averno ("The Sons of Hell"). On February 15, 2009, Mephisto unsuccessfully challenged Místico for the CMLL World Welterweight Championship on a New Japan Pro-Wrestling show in Sumo Hall, Tokyo. On May 27, 2009, Mephisto defeated La Sombra to win the NWA World Welterweight Championship. During Mephisto's reign, the title was replaced with the NWA World Historic Welterweight Championship. On August 16, 2010, it was announced that Mephisto was one of 14 men putting their mask on the line in a Luchas de Apuestas steel cage match, the main event of the CMLL 77th Anniversary Show. Mephisto was the second man to leave the steel cage as all three members of Los Hijos del Averno quickly left the cage, keeping their masks safe. The match came down to La Sombra pinning Olímpico to unmask him. On March 13, 2011, Mephisto lost the NWA World Historic Welterweight Championship to La Sombra.

In April 2011 El Terrible and El Texano, Jr. split from Los Hijos del Averno to form a new faction with Rey Bucanero called La Fuerza TRT ("The TRT Power"). On July 15, Los Hijos del Averno defeated La Generación Dorada ("The Golden Generation"; Máscara Dorada, La Máscara and La Sombra) to win the CMLL World Trios Championship. They would lose the title to El Bufete del Amor (Marco Corleone, Máximo and Rush) on February 19, 2012. Mephisto returned to Japan in January 2013, when he took part in the three-day Fantastica Mania 2013 event, co-promoted by CMLL and New Japan Pro-Wrestling in Tokyo. During the first night on January 18, he teamed with Gedo and Jado to defeat Atlantis, Jushin Thunder Liger and Tiger Mask in a six-man tag team match. The following night, Mephisto and Okumura defeated Diamante and Máscara Dorada in a tag team match. During the third and final night, Mephisto teamed with Euforia and Kazuchika Okada in a six-man tag team main event, where they were defeated by Atlantis, Hiroshi Tanahashi and Prince Devitt. On August 13, Mephisto defeated La Máscara for the Mexican National Light Heavyweight Championship. On January 1, 2014, Mephisto defended the Mexican National Light Heavyweight Championship against Atlantis.

In January 2014, Mephisto returned to Japan to take part in the five-day Fantastica Mania 2014 tour. In the main event of the fourth show on January 18, he successfully defended the Mexican National Light Heavyweight Championship against Místico. Mephisto participated in the 2014 La Copa Junior VIP tournament in the first qualifying round that took place on the September 26, 2014 Super Viernes show. Mephisto first defeated Guerrero Maya Jr., then Shocker and finally Volador Jr. to qualify for the finals On October 10 Mephisto lost in the finals to Máximo.

Los Hijos del Infierno (2015-present)

With Averno's exit from CMLL in 2014 Mephisto and Ephesto continued to team up, but never used the name "Hijos del Averno".Months later they began being introduced as "Los Hijos del Infierno", ("The Sons of the Infierno") where Mephisto became the leader of the team and they and added a third member, Luciferno, (formerly known as Hooligan). In January 2015, Mephisto returned to Japan to take part in the Fantastica Mania 2015 tour, during which he joined Bullet Club and successfully defended the Mexican National Light Heavyweight Championship against Stuka Jr.

On August 9, 2015 Los Hijos del Infierno defeated Los Reyes de la Atlantida ("The Kings of the Atlantis"; Atlantis, Delta and Guerrero Maya Jr.) to win the Mexican National Trios Championship, Mephisto's second Trios title reign and the first team championship for Los Hijos del Infierno. Atlantis defeated Mephisto to win the Mexican National Light Heavyweight Championship on August 24, 2015, ending Mephisto's reign after 741 days. In January 2016, Mephisto returned to NJPW to take part in the Fantastica Mania 2016 tour, during which no reference was made to his previous association with Bullet Club. In the main event of the final show, Mephisto unsuccessfully challenged Volador Jr. for the NWA World Historic Welterweight Championship. On May 2, 2016, Mephisto defeated Máscara Dorada to win the CMLL World Welterweight Championship for the second time.

Championships and accomplishments
Consejo Mundial de Lucha Libre
CMLL World Tag Team Championship (3 times) – with Averno
CMLL World Trios Championship (1 time) – with Averno and Ephesto
CMLL World Welterweight Championship (2 times)
Mexican National Light Heavyweight Championship (1 time)
Mexican National Trios Championship (2 times) – with El Satánico and Averno (1 time), with Ephesto and Luciferno (1 time)
Mexican National Welterweight Championship (1 time)
NWA World Welterweight Championship (1 time)
NWA World Historic Welterweight Championship (1 time)
CMLL Torneo de Parejas Increíbles (2016) – with Místico
Pro Wrestling Illustrated
PWI ranked him # 54 of the 500 best singles wrestlers of the PWI 500 in 2006.

Luchas de Apuestas record

Notes

References

1968 births
Living people
Masked wrestlers
Mexican male professional wrestlers
People from Toluca
Professional wrestlers from the State of Mexico
Unidentified wrestlers
Bullet Club members
20th-century professional wrestlers
21st-century professional wrestlers
Mexican National Trios Champions
CMLL World Tag Team Champions
CMLL World Trios Champions
CMLL World Welterweight Champions
Mexican National Welterweight Champions
NWA World Historic Welterweight Champions
NWA World Welterweight Champions
Mexican National Light Heavyweight Champions